340 on the Park is a residential tower in the Lakeshore East development of the neighborhood of New Eastside/ East Loop Chicago and was completed in 2007. The building briefly surpassed 55 East Erie as the tallest all-residential building in Chicago.

The architectural firm Solomon Cordwell Buenz designed the tower and it was built by Magellan Development. The structural engineering firm Magnusson Klemencic Associates designed the building using post-tensioning in order increase the floor-to-ceiling heights.  James McHugh Construction Co installed post-tensioning tendons supplied by Amsysco Inc.

The tower is located in the Lakeshore East complex which, when completed, will house thousands of residents. 340 on the Park is set flush next to Randolph Street, allowing unobstructed views of Millennium Park, Grant Park, The Park at Lakeshore East and Lake Michigan. The tower's design also allows for nearby buildings to maintain some views of the park.

340 on the Park has also become the first residential tower in the Midwestern United States to achieve Silver LEED certification for its "green" design, including a large winter garden for residents. Additional benefits include a connection to the Chicago Pedway system, low-flow water fixtures for both residential and public spaces, and energy-efficient fixtures such as lights and mechanical equipment.

The north side of the building is contoured so that views from The Buckingham next to the building are not interfered with.

Education

Residents of 340 on the Park are zoned to schools in the Chicago Public Schools.
 Ogden School (K–8)
 Wells Community Academy High School

See also
 List of buildings
 List of skyscrapers
 List of tallest buildings in Chicago
 List of tallest buildings in the United States
 World's tallest structures

Position in Chicago's skyline

References

External links

 Official 340 On the Park website
 Emporis listing
 Solomon Cordwell Buenz website

Residential condominiums in Chicago
Residential skyscrapers in Chicago
Leadership in Energy and Environmental Design basic silver certified buildings
Residential buildings completed in 2007
New Eastside
Lakeshore East
2007 establishments in Illinois